Bullseye is an Australian comedy adventure film directed by Carl Schultz.

The movie is also known as The Trailblazer, Trailblazer, Outback and Birdsville.

Plot
In the 1860s, two friends, Harry and Bluey, steal a thousand head of cattle and trek it across country from Queensland to Adelaide.

Cast
Paul Goddard as Harry Walford
Kathryn Walker as Lily Boyd
John Wood as Bluey McGurk
Paul Chubb as Don Mckenzie
Lynette Curran as Dora Mckenzie
Bruce Spence as Purdy
David Slingsby as Spence
John Meillon as Merritt
Kerry Walker as Mrs Gootch
Rhys McConnochie as Judge

Production
Robert Wales' script was originally called Trailblazer. It was based on the cattle drive of Harry Readford, known as Captain Starlight, which inspired the novel Robbery Under Arms. PBL Productions, then an offshoot of the Nine Network, bought the script and at one stage Joan Long was going to produce with Peter Yeldham working on the script. Then Carl Schultz was hired as director and he wanted to turn it into a comedy, so Yeldham left the project. PBL formed a partnership with Dumbarton Films who had worldwide marketing rights to the film.

The two leads were inexperienced: Kathryn Walker was an architecture student doing some modelling and Paul Goddard had only been in one small role.

The movie was shot on location in the Australian outback, with the town of Bourke standing in for Roma, and studio scenes shot at Mort Bay studios in Balmain, Sydney. Shooting finished on 14 November 1985.

Release
Hoyts wanted to release the film but Dumbarton held up the release hoping for a major Hollywood distributor to handle the film in the same way as Crocodile Dundee. This did not occur and the film was not released until two years after it was made. It was not a financial success.

One critic wrote that "the film is entertaining in its contrived absurdity but lacks any substance behind the comic set ups." However David Stratton called the film "hugely entertaining".

Home Media
Bullseye was released on DVD by Umbrella Entertainment in January 2011. The DVD is compatible with all region codes.

References

External links

Bullseye at TCMDB
Bullseye at BFI

1987 films
Films set in colonial Australia
Films set in Queensland
Films set in South Australia
Films set in the 1860s
Films scored by Chris Neal (songwriter)
1980s English-language films